Chelopechene may refer to the following places in Bulgaria:
 Chelopechene, Dobrich Province, a village in Dobrich Province
 , a neighbourhood of Kremikovtsi, Sofia Province

See also 
 Chelopech, a village and municipality in Sofia Province, Bulgaria